is a passenger railway station located in the city of  Funabashi, Chiba Prefecture, Japan, operated by the private railway operator Shin-Keisei Electric Railway.

Lines

Station layout 
The station consists of two opposed side platforms, with an elevated station building.

Platforms

History
Misaki Station was opened on January 8, 1949. The current elevated station building was completed in 1987.

Passenger statistics
In fiscal 2018, the station was used by an average of 14,071 passengers daily.

Surrounding area
 Funabashi City Misaki Public Hall
 Funabashi City Northern Welfare Hall
 Funabashi City North Health Center

See also
 List of railway stations in Japan

References

External links

  Shin Keisei Railway Station information

Railway stations in Japan opened in 1949
Railway stations in Chiba Prefecture
Funabashi